The national symbols of Yemen are official and unofficial flags, icons or cultural expressions that are emblematic, representative or otherwise characteristic of Yemen and of its culture.

Symbol

References 

National symbols of Yemen